Radical 90 or radical half tree trunk meaning "half of a tree trunk" or "split wood" is 1 of 34 Kangxi radicals (214 radicals total) composed of 4 strokes.
 
In the Kangxi Dictionary, there are 48 characters (out of 49,030) to be found under this radical.

In the Table of Indexing Chinese Character Components predominantly adopted by Simplified Chinese dictionaries published in mainland China,  is listed as the associated indexing component under the 45th principal indexing component . Similar inconsistency can also be found in Japanese shinjitai.

Evolution

Derived characters

Literature

External links

Unihan Database - U+723F

090
045